Bəydövül  (also, Bəydəvil, Beydavil and Beydeyul’) is a village and municipality in the Goychay Rayon of Azerbaijan.  It has a population of 1,308.

References 

Populated places in Goychay District